Alex Rhodes may refer to:

Alex Rhodes (footballer) (born 1982), English footballer
Alex Rhodes (cyclist) (born 1984), Australian cyclist